The Umayyad conquest of Sindh took place in 711 AD and resulted in Sindh being incorporated into the Umayyad Caliphate. The conquest resulted in the overthrow of the last Hindu dynasty of Sindh, the Brahman dynasty of Sindh after the death of Raja Dahir.

Background 
Although there was no connection between Arabia and Sindh, the war being started was due to events of piracy that plagued the Arabian Sea, at the time the caliph of the Umayyad Caliphate offered Raja Dahir protection and sovereignty if he would help him in quelling the piracy.

Raja Dahir of Sindh had refused to return Arab rebels from Sindh and furthermore, Meds and others. Meds shipping from their bases at Kutch, Debal and Kathiawar during one of their raids had kidnapped Muslim women travelling from Sri Lanka to Arabia, thus providing a casus belli against Sindh Raja Dahir. Raja Dahir expressed his inability to help retrieve the prisoners and after two expeditions was defeated in Sindh. Al Hajjaj equipped an army built around 6,000 Syrian cavalry and detachments of mawali from Iraq, six thousand camel riders, and a baggage train of 3,000 camels under his Nephew Muhammad bin Qasim to Sindh. His artillery of five catapults were sent to Debal by sea ("manjaniks").

Invasion 
After conquering Brahmanabad in Sindh, Ibn Qasim co-opted the local Brahman elite, whom he held in esteem, re-appointing them to posts held under the Brahman dynasty and offering honours and awards to their religious leaders and scholars. This arrangement with local Brahman elites resulted in the continued persecution of Jatts, with Bin Qasim confirming the existing Brahman regulation forbidding them from wearing anything but coarse clothing and requiring them to always walk barefoot accompanied by dogs. The eastern Jats supported the Sind ruler, Dahir, against the Arab invaders, whereas the western Jats aligned with Muhammad bin Qasim against Dahir. Having settled the question of the freedom of religion and the social status of the Brahmans, Muhammad bin al-Qasim turned his attention to the Jats and Lohana. chronicles such as the Chach Nama, Zainul-Akhbar and Tarikh-I-Baihaqi have recorded battles between Jats and forces of Muhammad ibn Qasim.  

Following his success in Sindh, Muhammad bin Qasim wrote to `the kings of Hind' calling upon them to surrender and accept the faith of Islam. He dispatched a force against al-Baylaman (Bhinmal), which is said to have offered submission. The Mid people of Surast (Maitrakas of Vallabhi) also made peace. Bin Qasim then sent a cavalry of 10,000 to Kanauj, along with a decree from the Caliph. He himself went with an army to the prevailing frontier of Kashmir called panj-māhīyāt (in west Punjab). Nothing is known of the Kanauj expedition. The frontier of Kashmir might be what is referred to as al-Kiraj in later records (Kira kingdom in Kangra Valley, Himachal Pradesh), which was apparently subdued.

Aftermath 
Bin Qasim was recalled in 715 CE and died en route. Al-Baladhuri writes that, upon his departure, the kings of al-Hind had come back to their kingdoms. The period of Caliph Umar II (r. 717–720) was relatively peaceful. Umar invited the kings of "al-Hind" to convert to Islam and become his subjects, in return for which they would continue to remain kings. Hullishah of Sindh and other kings accepted the offer and adopted Arab names.

The Umayyad conquest brought the region into the cosmopolitan network of Islam. Many Sindhi Muslims played an important part during the  Islamic Golden Age; including Abu Mashar Sindhi and Abu Raja Sindhi. Famous jurist Abd al-Rahman al-Awza'i is also reported by Al-Dhahabi to be originally from Sindh.

References

History of Sindh
Invasions by the Umayyad Caliphate
8th-century conflicts
8th-century military history
8th century in the Umayyad Caliphate